Newtonferry ("the harbour of the ships") is a small crofting community on the island of North Uist in the Western Isles of Scotland, at the end of the B893 road. Newtonferry is within the parish of North Uist.

A number of archaeological sites have been discovered in the vicinity.

A ferry used to run between Newtonferry and the neighboring island of Berneray, but no longer runs since a permanent causeway was constructed between Berneray and North Uist.

See also 
 Loch an Sticir
 Dun an Sticir

References

External links

Canmore - North Uist, Port Nan Long, Crois Mhic Jamain site record
Canmore - Port Nan Long, North Uist site record

Villages on North Uist